James S. Mitchell (1784–1844) was a member of the U.S. House of Representatives from Pennsylvania.

Mitchell was born near Rossville, Pennsylvania, in 1784.  He was a member of the Pennsylvania House of Representatives from 1812 to 1814.

Mitchell was elected as a Republican to the Seventeenth Congress, reelected as a Jackson Republican to the Eighteenth Congress, and elected as a Jacksonian to the Nineteenth Congress.  He moved to Jefferson County, Ohio, in 1827, and later to Belleville, Illinois, where he died in 1844.  Interment at Dillsburg, Pennsylvania.

Sources

The Political Graveyard

1784 births
1844 deaths
Members of the Pennsylvania House of Representatives
People from York County, Pennsylvania
Democratic-Republican Party members of the United States House of Representatives from Pennsylvania
Jacksonian members of the United States House of Representatives from Pennsylvania
19th-century American politicians